Ware is a surname. The surname likely originates from people who lived or were employed around weirs such as Ware in Hertfordshire, England but could also be from "Waer" a nickname. Notable people with the surname include:

 Andre Ware, American football quarterback
Arthur Wellington Ware  (1861 – 29 January 1927), Mayor of Adelaide, South Australia, 1898–1901
His brothers Thomas, George and Charles, all involved with Walkerville Brewery in Adelaide
 Bruce A. Ware, American theological academic
 Charles Eliot Ware (1814–1887), American physician
 Charles Pickard Ware (1849–1921), American educator and folk music transcriber 
 Charles R. Ware, American naval officer
 Charlie Ware (1900-1984), Irish hurler
 Charlie Ware (1933-2013), Irish hurler
 Caroline F. Ware, American historian and social scientist
 Chris Ware, American cartoonist
 Christopher Lee Ware, Male fashionista, scarf designer, creator of EAD
 David S. Ware, American jazz saxophonist
 DeMarcus Ware, American football player
 Fabian Ware, founder of British Imperial War Graves Commission
 George Ware, American dendrologist
 Harold Ware, American communist
 Henry Ware (disambiguation), multiple people
 Herta Ware, American actress and activist
 Isaac Ware (1704-1766), English architect and translator of Italian Renaissance architect Andrea Palladio
 James Ware (disambiguation), multiple people
 Jeff Ware (disambiguation), multiple people
 Jeremy Ware, Canadian baseball player
 Jessie Ware (born 1984), British singer

 John Ware (disambiguation), multiple people
 John Ware (cowboy), American-Canadian cowboy
 John Ware (physician) (1795–1864), American physician and professor of medicine
 John H. Ware, III, a US Representative from Pennsylvania
 Jylan Ware (born 1993), American football player
 Kallistos Ware, Bishop of Diokleia in Phrygia, and Orthodox theologian
 Keith L. Ware, U.S. Army Major General killed in Vietnam.
 Kevin Ware (born 1993), American basketball player
 Lancelot Ware, British barrister and MENSA founder
 Leon Ware (1940–2017), American soul musician
 Marilyn Ware (1943-2017), American diplomat
 Martha Ware (1917-2009), American jurist and politician
 Martyn Ware, British electronic musician
 Mary Lee Ware (1858–1937), American philanthropist
 Mary Ware (writer) (1828 –1915), poet, prose writer
 Matt Ware, American football player
 Michael Ware, Australian journalist
 Mike Ware (ice hockey), Canadian ice hockey player
 Mike Ware (photographer), chemist and alternative-process photographer
 Nicholas Ware, American politician
 Opoku Ware I, Ashanti King
 Opoku Ware II, Ashanti King
 Onzlee Ware, American politician from Virginia
 Paul Ware, English footballer
 Rick Ware, American racing driver
 Riley Ware, American football player
Rosie Ware (born 1959), Torres Strait Islander textile designer and printmaker
 Scott Ware, American football player
 Sidney William Ware, Scottish soldier
 Spencer Ware (born 1991), American football player
 Taylor Ware, American singer and yodeler
 Teyon Ware, American amateur wrestler
 Theron Ware, fictional character from The Damnation of Theron Ware
 Tim Ware, American musician
 Tom Mauchahty-Ware, Native American musician
 Tommy Ware (1885–1915), English footballer
 Wallace Ware, a pseudonym used by novelist and screenwriter David Karp
 Wilbur Ware, American jazz bassist
 William Ware, American novelist
 William Robert Ware, American architect

See also
Buzzy Wares (1886–1964), American baseball player
Eddie Wares (1915–1992), Canadian hockey player
Shamsul Wares (born 1946), Bangladeshi architect
Wear (surname)

References